The steam railbuses of Bavarian Class MCCi were built between 1906 - 1908 for the Royal Bavarian State Railways (Königlich Bayerische Staatsbahn) for suburban services in the Munich area. Seven units were produced, the coach bodies being manufactured by MAN and the engines by Maffei.

The railbuses had a B'2' axle arrangement, thus two of the four axles were driven. The engine was technically very similar to that of the four-wheeled Lokalbahn (branch line) locomotives of Bavarian Class ML 2/2.

In the mid-1920s as the vehicles were taken over by the Deutsche Reichsbahn, four of the railbuses were converted to electric propulsion and initially classified as the D4i elT and later as ET 85. They were therefore prototypes for the DRG's Class ET 85s.

Another MCCi was converted to a diesel railbus in 1928 by MAN (VT 865); this did not prove effective however and was retired by the end of the 1920s.

See also 
Royal Bavarian State Railways 
List of Bavarian locomotives and railbuses

External links 

 Section through the railbus

0-4-4 locomotives
MCCi
Railmotors